

Mitch Bratt

Mitchell Eric Bratt (born July 3, 2003) is a Canadian professional baseball pitcher in the Texas Rangers organization.

Bratt grew up in Newmarket, Ontario and attended Newmarket High School. After most Canadian baseball leagues were shut down due to Covid-19, he pitched for Georgia Premier Academy in Statesboro, Georgia while completing his final year of high school online. Bratt played summer collegiate baseball after his senior year for the West Virginia Black Bears of the MLB Draft League and had a 2.57 ERA and 44 strikeouts in 28 innings pitched.

Bratt was selected by the Texas Rangers in the fifth round of the 2021 Major League Baseball Draft. After signing with the team he was assigned to ACL Rangers of the Rookie-level Arizona Complex League, where he did not allow an earned run and struck out 13 batters in six innings pitched. Bratt spent the 2022 season with the Down East Wood Ducks of the Low-A Carolina League, going 5–5 with a 2.45 ERA and 99 strikeouts over  innings. Bratt was the recipient of the 2022 Wayne Norton Award, as the top Canadian MiLB player for that season.

References

External links

2003 births
Living people
West Virginia Black Bears players
Arizona Complex League Rangers players
Down East Wood Ducks players
World Baseball Classic players of Canada
2023 World Baseball Classic players
Baseball people from Ontario